Bernt Collet may refer to:

 Bernt Johan Collet (born 1941), Danish politician
 Bernt Anker Collet, Norwegian-born Danish landowner